Onthophagus gemma, is a species of dung beetle found in India, and Sri Lanka.

Description
This minute oval, compact and convex species has an average length of about 3.5 to 4 mm. Body black and shiny. Head and prothorax bright golden-red. Antennae and mouthparts yellowish, whereas legs are rusty red. There are very minute pale setae on the dorsum. Head short and less broad. Clypeus rugosely punctured in front. Pronotum sparsely and irregularly, with punctures. Elytra finely striate, with flat intervals and distinctly punctured. Pygidium finely and sparingly punctured.

References 

Scarabaeinae
Insects of India
Beetles of Sri Lanka
Insects described in 1875